Hurricane Fico was the longest-lived hurricane of the 1978 Pacific hurricane season and became the longest-lasting Pacific hurricane on record, a record broken by Hurricane Tina fourteen years later. The sixth tropical storm, fourth hurricane, and third major hurricane, Fico developed from a tropical disturbance off the Pacific coast of Mexico on July 9. Fico slowly weakened as it turned to the northwest over cooler waters, and became an extratropical cyclone on July 28 to the northeast of Midway Island.

Swells from Fico, combined with swells from a storm in the Southern Hemisphere, produced rough surf throughout the Hawaiian islands. The surf destroyed one house and resulted in considerable damage along the southern coast of the island of Hawaii. No deaths were reported, and damage totaled $200,000 (1978 USD, $619,000 2006 USD).

Meteorological history 

Tropical Storm Fico turned to the northwest after reaching tropical storm status, and entered an area of increasingly warm water temperatures. It quickly strengthened, and 18 hours after becoming a tropical storm Fico strengthened into a hurricane. As the hurricane turned to the west-northwest, a well-defined eye developed in the center of the hurricane, and Fico continued to quickly intensify.

While moving nearly due westward, Fico maintained peak winds for about 12 hours before weakening over cooler water temperatures. The hurricane turned to the northwest toward an upper-level trough of low pressure, and after maintaining  winds for about 36 hours it slowly weakened. It weakened to a tropical depression the next day, and late on July 28, after turning to the north, Fico became an extratropical depression. An approaching cold front absorbed the remnants of Fico and passed near southern Alaska on July 31. Ships to the southeast of Cold Bay reported heavy rainfall and strong winds in association with the remnants of Fico.

Impact 

Hurricane Fico never made landfall, though a strong east-northeasterly swell from the hurricane along with a strong southerly swell from a southern hemisphere storm produced high surf along the coastline of Hawaii. Civil Defense officials reported  waves well offshore. Southern Oahu and Kauai also reported slightly above normal waves. The high seas washed a  tugboat ashore on a reef at Kukuiula. Six people aboard a sloop off Hanalei were rescued by a Navy torpedo boat after it lost its auxiliary power and was unable to progress in the strong winds of Fico. A strong trade wind gradient, increased due to the presence of the hurricane, produced winds of over  throughout the island chain. Hurricane Fico also dropped  of rainfall in Oahu.

Days before the hurricane passed to the south of the state, high surf from Fico caused some beach flooding in the eastern portion of the island of Hawaii. High surf later resulted in considerable damage to roads and beachfront houses along the Big Island shores. The waves destroyed a home in Puna and wrecked a beach pavilion in Kau. The mayors of three Hawaiian cities issued a disaster declaration for their cities following the damage from Fico. In Maui, moderate waves led to road flooding near the water, though no damage occurred on the island.  winds throughout Hawaii downed trees, resulting in some power outages. Damage from the hurricane totaled $200,000 (1978 USD, $619,000 2006 USD).

Records and naming 
Fico was a northeast Pacific tropical cyclone for 20 days or 468 hours, breaking the previous record since the beginning of reliable satellite monitoring set by Hurricane Celeste of 1972 with 16 days. Fico was also a hurricane for 17 days, which also broke the record set by Celeste of 1972 with 10 days. Both records were later broken by Hurricane Tina.

This hurricane was the only usage of the name Fico. The name Fico was removed after this storm and replaced with Fabio in the 1982 season. It was the first male tropical cyclone name to be retired in the Eastern Pacific Ocean. It is unknown whether it was retired due to its damage or for another reason. Other possible reasons listed for the removal of a name are pronunciation ambiguity, a socially unacceptable meaning in another language, or because the storm name represented a significant human disaster.

See also 

 Hurricane John (1994)
 Hurricane Dora (1999)
 List of Pacific hurricanes
 List of retired Pacific hurricane names
 List of Hawaii hurricanes
 List of Category 4 Pacific hurricanes

References

External links 
 CPHC Report
 Unisys Storm Track

1978 in Alaska
1978 Pacific hurricane season
Category 4 Pacific hurricanes
Tropical cyclones in Alaska
Hurricanes in Hawaii
1978 in Hawaii